Carrolls Crossing is a settlement in Northumberland County, New Brunswick, Canada.

History

Notable people

See also
List of communities in New Brunswick

References
 

Settlements in New Brunswick
Communities in Northumberland County, New Brunswick